TJ Dvůr Králové is a Czech football club located in the town of Dvůr Králové nad Labem in the Hradec Králové Region. It currently plays in Divize C, which is in the Czech Fourth Division. The club has taken part in the Czech Cup numerous times, reaching the second round in 2004–05, 2005–06, 2006–07, 2007–08, 2008–09, 2009–10, 2010–11, 2012–13 and 2013–14.

References

External links
  

Football clubs in the Czech Republic
Association football clubs established in 1906
Hradec Králové Region
1906 establishments in Austria-Hungary